Holybourne Hill or Holybourne Down is one of the highest points in the county of Hampshire, England, and in the Hampshire Downs, rising to  above sea level.

Holybourne Hill rises not far from the village of Holybourne in Hampshire.

References 

Hills of Hampshire